San Rafael Municipality is the third municipal section of the José Miguel de Velasco Province in the Santa Cruz Department, Bolivia. San Rafael de Velasco is the seat of the municipality. Its mission church is part of the World Heritage Site Jesuit Missions of Chiquitos.

Languages 
The predominant language spoken in the San Rafael Municipality is Spanish.

References 

 www.mancochiquitana.org / San Rafael Municipality (Spanish)
 www.ine.gov.bo

External links 
 Map of José Miguel de Velasco Province

Municipalities of Santa Cruz Department (Bolivia)